Michelle Arturo Castro Galindo (born April 9, 1989 Mexico City, Mexico) is a Mexican professional footballer who last played for Pumas Morelos.

External links
 

1989 births
Living people
Club Universidad Nacional footballers
Liga MX players
Ascenso MX players
Liga Premier de México players
Footballers from Mexico City
Association footballers not categorized by position
Mexican footballers